John Orcsik (born 3 May 1945) credited also variously as Jon Orcsik, John Orschik, John Orscik and John Crosik is an Australian actor, screenwriter, director and producer of Hungarian descent, known for his television roles starting from the late 1960s, but also for the film version of the soap opera Number 96. He was married to actress Paula Duncan.

Career 

Orcsik, made his debut appearing in the rural drama soap opera Bellbird, in 1967, subsequently he played various guest roles in the Crawford Productions police dramas Homicide, Division 4 and Matlock Police.

He had a role in serial Number 96 in 1972, and subsequently reprised that role in the feature-film version of the serial filmed in December 1973. He later reappeared in that series late in its run, briefly playing a different character and this time credited as John Crosik. He also appeared in the film Petersen (1974), and played a brief role in action film The Man from Hong Kong (1975).

After roles in other Crawford Productions programs Bluey (1976), and The Sullivans, and an appearance in Chopper Squad (1978), in 1978 he joined new Crawfords Productions police series Cop Shop early in its run as Det. Mike Georgiou, and quickly became one of the show's most popular cast members. He continued in the role until the end of the series in December 1983. He had married his Cop Shop co-star Paula Duncan in June 1982. They have since divorced although have subsequently worked together in fundraising activities, and later acted together in Paradise Beach.

After Cop Shop ended Orcsik worked as a television scriptwriter, contributing several scripts to the series Prisoner. He also continued acting and through the 1980s played several roles in television movies and miniseries, including Harvest of Hate (1979), The Hijacking of the Achille Lauro (1989), Displaced Persons (1984), Dadah Is Death (1988), Kokoda Crescent (1989). Other roles of the 1980s include an appearance in television series Mission: Impossible (1988), and the film The Edge of Power (1987). With his swarthy, Mediterranean appearance, Orcsik was cast as Middle Eastern characters in many of these productions.

He also had roles in such Australian television series such as The Zoo Family (1985), Home and Away (1992), Paradise Beach (1993), Lift Off (1995), Pacific Drive (1996), and Medivac (1997). He directed the TV movie Academy (1996).

Orcsik's more recent acting appearances include a cameo role as a doctor in miniseries The Day of the Roses (1998), a recurring role in serial Neighbours (1999–2002), roles in Stingers (2000), Blue Heelers (2002), MDA (2002), The Saddle Club (2003), Always Greener (2002 and 2003),  Scooter: Secret Agent (2005) and Underbelly – The Man Who Got Away (TV Movie) (2011).

He played the gypsy leader Alexandru Draghici in "Sorrow Song", S5:E2 of The Doctor Blake Mysteries (2019).

After a request by industry professionals in Queensland, John started film and television acting studio The Australian Film & Television Academy (TAFTA) in 1994. He has since expanded to Melbourne and Sydney and continues to run classes online and in-person.

Filmography

References

Notes
 TAFTA -Filmography
 Cop Shop 
 Memorable TV
 Marnie Hill: The actors' handbook: a guide to the Australian entertainment industry

External links
 

1945 births
Living people
Australian people of Hungarian descent
Australian male film actors
Australian male soap opera actors
20th-century Australian male actors
21st-century Australian male actors